The Kennedy Street School is located near the downtown area of Anderson, South Carolina. It was constructed in 1913, and is considered historically significant primarily because its architectural style is considered representative and typical of the Commercial style with Classical Revival details favored in the first quarter of the 20th century. The auditorium, added in 1960, is an excellent example of Modern style architecture.  The 1913 school building was designed by architect Joseph Huntley Casey of Anderson, S.C.  The Kennedy Street School was listed in the National Register on October 24, 2007.

References

School buildings on the National Register of Historic Places in South Carolina
Neoclassical architecture in South Carolina
Buildings and structures in Anderson County, South Carolina
School buildings completed in 1913
National Register of Historic Places in Anderson County, South Carolina
1913 establishments in South Carolina